is a Japanese manga written and illustrated by Namiru Matsumoto. It was serialized online on Niconico Seiga from July 2015 to September 2019. An anime television series adaptation by Diomedéa and Studio Blanc aired from October to December 2017.

Synopsis
With nothing left to lose, ordinary high school student Haruka Shinozaki confesses to beautiful, diligent class representative Akiho Kosaka and to his surprise she accepts. Akiho takes dating as seriously as she does everything else, but does not quite get it. She pragmatically suggests activities that are too sexual.

Characters

Haruka is a shy and gentle boy who is a second-year in high school. He is quite popular with the girls in his neighborhood, but remains unaware of, or is simply not interested in, their romantic inclinations towards him. He has sexual fantasies, but is too shy to express them. He has been in love with Akiho since he was a high school first-year, but once she agrees to become his girlfriend, he finds out some things about her which he has some trouble to getting used to.

Akiho is a beautiful, aloof-looking high school second-year model student and popular girl in her class, and Haruka's love interest. However, she has absolutely no experience with intimate relationships and thus tends to overanalyze this topic in her nervousness. She has the habit of approaching sexual topics in a straightforward manner, a trait which was ingrained into her by her mother at an early age, hence the name.

Shizuku is a lively third-year high school student and childhood friend of Haruka, who merely sees her as an older sister and thus addresses her as such. However, she has recently become romantically interested in Haruka as well and makes several playful and obvious allusions towards him, even though she is too shy to take the initiative when things have a chance to get serious.

Rina is a charismatic girl from a wealthy family who transferred to Haruka's school in search of a boyfriend. Like Akiho, she is very liberal in talking about sex-related matters, but since she previously attended an all-girl school and could only find romance with other girls, her experience in romancing males is practically non-existent. She owns two dogs, Butter and Margarine, whom she regards like human beings.

Kanata is Haruka's younger sister by one year, who adopts a cat-like behavior pattern and is seldom seen without her cat-ear hoodie jacket. She is very infatuated with her older brother and considers herself the only girl cute enough to be his girlfriend. One of her favorite interactions with him is to have him pet her on the head.

Saori is Haruka and Akiho's classmate, as well as the class president. She is a moralist and a prudish girl who tends to overreact, thereby driving herself hysterical for no plausible reason.

Sayo is a girl who keeps her hair hanging in front of her eyes. She is very shy in personal relations, but likes to peep on romantic couples and excite herself on what she sees.

Misaki is a classmate and friend of Kanata who works part-time in an ice cream shop. Like Akiho, she tends to associate everyday occurrences with sex-related fantasies; but unlike Akiho, she is terribly shy about her puberal imaginations.

Hoshikawa is Haruka's classmate and a handsome, if narcisstic boy who enjoys the romantic attention of nearly every girl in school. However, Hoshikawa is only interested in male-to-male relationships, especially with Haruka, who naturally fails to notice the deeper significance of Hoshikawa's allusions.

Haruka and Akiho's homeroom and physical education teacher, and a former schoolmate and friend of Aoi Koshimizu.

She is one of the teachers at Haruka's school, as well as the school nurse. She is quite lecherous and stays long after closing hours in the infirmary to receive and get "entertained" by selected male students.

Fuyumi is Akiho's mother, who greatly resembles her daughter in both appearance and demeanor.

Natsuo is Akiho's father, who in personality and looks shares many similarities with Haruka and, despite the years they have spent together, is still taken by surprise by his wife's peculiarities.

Media

Manga
My Girlfriend Is Shobitch is written and illustrated by Namiru Matsumoto. It was serialized online on Niconico Seiga on July 20, 2015 to September 13, 2019, and it was also serialized on Comic Walker and Comic Newtype. The individual chapters are collected into eight tankōbon volumes published by Kadokawa.

Anime
A 10-episode anime television series adaptation aired from October 12 to December 13, 2017. The anime is directed by Nobuyoshi Nagayama and is animated as a collaboration of Diomedéa and Studio Blanc. The scripts are written by Hideki Shirane and character designs are by Shōko Yasuda. Nippon Columbia produced the music. An original video animation episode was bundled with the manga's sixth volume. Sentai Filmworks has licensed the series and it is streaming on Anime Strike in the US, on Hidive outside of the U.S., and on AnimeLab in Australia and New Zealand. Sentai Filmworks released the series for home video with an English dub on February 12, 2019.

Reception 
In a review of the anime for NEO, Alex Jones believed the developing relationship between Haruka and Akiho to be what made the premise work. However, he felt the jokes got more low-brow and generic with the more characters the series added, and ultimately felt that the miscommunication between the lead couple wasn't enough to carry the whole show.

Explanatory notes

References

External links
 My Girlfriend Is Shobitch at Comic Newtype 
  
 

2017 anime television series debuts
2015 manga
Anime series based on manga
Anime Strike
Diomedéa
Japanese webcomics
Kadokawa Dwango franchises
Kadokawa Shoten manga
Romantic comedy anime and manga
Seinen manga
Sentai Filmworks
Slice of life anime and manga
Studio Blanc
Webcomics in print